Ocaklı is a village in the Gelibolu District of Çanakkale Province in Turkey. Its population is 122 (2021).

References

Villages in Gelibolu District